Dolna Lešnica is a village in the municipality of Želino, North Macedonia.

History
According to the 1467-68 Ottoman defter, Dolna Lešnica appears as being inhabited by an Orthodox Christian Albanian population. Some families had a mixed Slav-Albanian anthroponomy - usually a Slavic first name and an Albanian last name or last names with Albanian patronyms and Slavic suffixes. The names are: Nasuhaç, son of Kondo; Gjorgji, his son; Vinko, Nasuhaç's brother.

Demographics
As of the 2021 census, Dolna Lešnica had 430 residents with the following ethnic composition:
Albanians 415
Persons for whom data are taken from administrative sources 15

According to the 2002 census, the village had a total of 625 inhabitants. Ethnic groups in the village include:
Albanians 615
Others 10

References

External links

Villages in Želino Municipality
Albanian communities in North Macedonia